Alexandra Lukin (born 29 May 1998) is a field hockey player from New Zealand, who plays as a midfielder.

Personal life
Alexandra Lukin was born and raised in Hamilton, New Zealand.

Career

Under-21
Alexandra Lukin made her debut for the New Zealand U-21 team in 2019 during a test series against Australia in Hastings.

Black Sticks
Lukin made her debut for the Black Sticks in 2022 during the Trans–Tasman Hockey Series in Auckland. Later that year she was named in the national squad for both the FIH World Cup in Terrassa and Amsterdam, as well as the XXII Commonwealth Games in Birmingham.

References

External links
 Alexandra Lukin at the New Zealand Hockey Federation
 
 
 

1998 births
Living people
New Zealand female field hockey players
Female field hockey midfielders
21st-century New Zealand women
Commonwealth Games competitors for New Zealand
Field hockey players at the 2022 Commonwealth Games